Orocrambus fugitivellus is a moth in the family Crambidae. It is endemic to New Zealand. It is classified as critically endangered by the Department of Conservation.

Taxonomy 
This species was first described by George Hudson in 1950 using a specimen collected by R. D. Dick in 1939 in an area adjacent to Grays River in the Mackenzie country. Hudson named the species Crambus fugitivellus. In 1975 David Edward Gaskin assigned Crambus fugitivellus to the genus Orocrambus. The type specimen of O. fugitivellus is held in the Hudson collection at Museum of New Zealand Te Papa Tongarewa.

Description 
The larvae of this species have yet to be described. The wingspan of the adult male is 18–19 mm. In appearance the adult male of O. fuitivellus is similar to O. aethonellus but differs in the more abrupt tapering of its forewings and the very oblique termen. The female of the species is brachypterous.

Distribution 
O. fugitivellus is endemic to New Zealand. The Grays River wetlands in the Mackenzie Basin is the only area where this species has been recorded. Male adults of the species have been recorded on wing in February and are active during the day.

Host plants 
Although this species inhabits shrub/grasslands its host plants have yet to be discovered.

Conservation Status 
This species has the "Nationally Critical" conservation status under the New Zealand Threat Classification System. It has been recommended that the type locality of O. fugitivellus, the Grays River wetlands, be protected to help conserve the species.

References

External links

 Holotype specimen of species

Crambinae
Moths described in 1950
Endemic fauna of New Zealand
Taxa named by George Hudson
Moths of New Zealand
Endangered species
Endangered biota of New Zealand
Endemic moths of New Zealand